Elmer, or Elbert, "Skippy" Williams (July 27, 1916 – February 28, 1994) was an American jazz tenor saxophonist and musical arranger.

First credited as the arranger for some July 12, 1939 recordings for Earl Hines and His Orchestra, Skippy Williams is best remembered as the substitute for Ben Webster in Duke Ellington's orchestra. Replacing Webster in August 1943, Williams appears on Ellington's Carnegie Hall recordings in December 1943. He left Ellington in May 1944, to start his own band and was replaced by Big Al Sears.

In the mid-1940s, he gave tenor sax classes to Pepper Adams in Rochester, NY, and was working with Thelonious Monk in 1946, credited as bandleader for Monk.

Williams also worked with Art Tatum, Fletcher Henderson, Count Basie, Lucky Millinder, Bob Chester, and, according to some sources, played tenor sax on the original recording of Bill Haley's "Rock Around the Clock", and "Shake, Rattle and Roll"  This claim is, however, false.

Filmography
Mistaken Identity (1941)

References 

Swing saxophonists
American jazz tenor saxophonists
American male saxophonists
Mainstream jazz saxophonists
Duke Ellington Orchestra members
1994 deaths
1916 births
20th-century American musicians
20th-century saxophonists
American male jazz musicians
20th-century American male musicians